Sant Jaume dels Domenys is a village in the province of Tarragona and autonomous community of Catalonia, Spain.

Notable residents 
 Marc Bartra, professional footballer who currently plays for Trabzonspor.

References

External links
 Government data pages 

Municipalities in Baix Penedès